The 2010 congressional elections in Wisconsin were held on November 2, 2010, to determine who would represent the state of Wisconsin in the United States House of Representatives.  It coincided with the state's senatorial and gubernatorial elections. Representatives were elected for two-year terms; those elected would serve in the 112th Congress from January 2011 until January 2013. Wisconsin has eight seats in the House, apportioned according to the 2000 United States Census.

Overview

By district
Results of the 2010 United States House of Representatives elections in Wisconsin by district:

District 1

Incumbent Republican Congressman Paul Ryan ran for a seventh term in this marginally conservative district based in southeastern Wisconsin. Congressman Ryan faced a nominal challenge from Democratic businessman John Heckenlively and Libertarian Joseph Kexel.

The Wisconsin State Journal sharply criticized Congressman Ryan, labeling him "a singularly ineffective representative" and lambasted his plans to privatize Social Security and Medicare, noting, "even the most anti-government extremists recognize that gambling America’s retirement security on the stock market is madness." The State Journal called for voters to vote for challenger Heckenlively, with the rationale that he "will fight for the interests of southeastern Wisconsin working families the incumbent has so neglected.

Given Ryan's district's mix of urban and rural, his winning percentages (always greater than 60% except for his first election) with a margin of greater than 68% in the 2010 election are remarkable.

District 2

Incumbent Democratic Congresswoman Tammy Baldwin, one of the few openly gay members of Congress, ran for a seventh term from this solidly liberal district based around the city of Madison, and she faced Republican candidate Chad Lee in the general election.

The Capital Times gave Congresswoman Baldwin glowing praise, observing that she "has eschewed the celebrity circuit and focused on heavy lifting in Washington and tending to the needs of her constituents in south-central Wisconsin’s 2nd district," calling the results of her work "impressive." Ultimately, the Capital Times concluded, "Baldwin’s service merits an enthusiastic endorsement, and she has it from us."

District 3

Democratic Congressman Ron Kind faced Republican State Senator Dan Kapanke in his bid for an eighth term from this liberal-leaning congressional district based that includes much of western Wisconsin. The campaign between Kapanke and Kind was brutal, with Kapanke and the National Republican Congressional Committee accusing Kind of charging two doctors in exchange for meeting with them to discuss a bill, a claim that Kind countered with allegations that Kapanke used $32,000 from a charity to improve a baseball stadium. In their debate, Kapanke attacked Kind for having supported much of President Obama’s agenda.

The Milwaukee Journal Sentinel endorsed Congressman Kind for re-election, noting, "Kind is a partisan with principles instead of someone who is principally, to the virtual exclusion of reasoned compromise, partisan." The Wisconsin State Journal criticized both Kind and Kapanke, noting that while they were "unimpressed with...Ron Kind" and that Kapanke was "scandal-plagued," Kind "is preferable to his...challenger."

District 4

Congresswoman Gwen Moore ran for a fourth term from this staunchly liberal district based largely in the city of Milwaukee. This district tends to give Democrats solid margins of victory, so Moore did not face a credible challenge from Republican candidate Dan Sebring or independent candidate Eddie Ayyash.

The Wisconsin State Journal strongly endorsed Congresswoman Moore in her bid for re-election, calling her "a gem with a terrific voting record and an accessible style that will earn her easy re-election."

District 5

This solidly conservative district based in the northern and western suburbs of Milwaukee, has been represented by Republican Congressman Jim Sensenbrenner since he was first elected in 1978. Running for a seventeenth term, Sensenbrenner faced a nominal challenge from Democratic businessman Todd Kolosso and independent candidate Robert R. Raymond, who had run against the Congressman in previous elections.

The Wisconsin State Journal soured on Congressman Sensenbrenner, calling him "irascible" and announcing that he "has reached his 'sell-by' date." The State Journal endorsed Kolosso, who they claimed "would be a more engaged representative."

District 6

Incumbent Republican Congressman Tom Petri has represented this conservative-leaning district based in east-central Wisconsin since he was first elected in a 1979 special election. Petri built a reputation as a moderate in Congress and was well-liked by the constituents of his district. Though he faced a challenge from Democratic candidate Joseph Kallas, Petri was in no real danger of losing his seat.

The Wisconsin State Journal has high praise for Congressman Petri, referring to him as a "moderate...who builds bipartisan coalitions on education issues and brings a thoughtful take to foreign policy debates."

District 7

When long-serving Democratic Congressman Dave Obey, the dean of the Wisconsin congressional delegation and the chairman of the House Appropriations Committee, declined to seek another term in this liberal-leaning district based in northwestern Wisconsin. Democratic State Senator Julie Lassa emerged as her party’s nominee, while Ashland County District Attorney Sean Duffy, who had starred on MTV’s The Real World: Boston became the Republican nominee. A contentious general election ensued, in which the candidates traded barbs and personal attacks against each other.

Duffy alleged that as a State Senator, Lassa accepted a $2,530 pay increase, even while the state was losing jobs and undergoing a budget deficit. Politifact, however, questioned the accuracy of this attack, noting that Lassa had given back half of the pay increase. Lassa returned fire with a hard-hitting television advertisement alleging that Duffy skimped on his responsibilities as a District Attorney and the quality of his office’s services declined as a result. Politifact again investigated this claim and rated it as "Barely true."

The Milwaukee Journal Sentinel praised both candidates in the race, observing, "both...candidates are a good fit for the district and would make able representatives." They praised Lassa for her "good work on several issues in the legislature," but ultimately endorsed Duffy, calling him, "the kind of independent thinker who might just shake things up in Washington." The Wisconsin State Journal, on the other hand, endorsed Lassa as a "more experienced and a more independent thinker than former MTV star Sean Duffy."

District 8

Seeking a third term in this marginally conservative district based in northeastern Wisconsin and the Green Bay metropolitan area, incumbent Democratic Congressman Steve Kagen faced a stiff challenge from Republican Reid Ribble, a roofing contractor and former minister from Kaukauna. Kagen and Ribble engaged in a bitterly fought general election, with Kagen accusing Ribble of wanting to privatize Social Security and Ribble responded by accusing Kagen of sending American jobs to China through his votes in Congress.

The Milwaukee Journal Sentinel had praise for both the Democratic and Republican candidates, describing them as "pragmatic and able, well suited to a district that skews conservative," but ultimately endorsed Congressman Kagen for re-election, observing, "he has a reliably independent streak" and noting that Kagen "got it right" on many of the issues that Ribble attacked him over, "and that makes him the better pick." The Wisconsin State Journal concurred, urging voters to "proudly re-elect" Congressman Kagen due to his opposition to the "bank bailout and bad trade deals" and his objections "to surging more troops into Afghanistan." The Green Bay Press-Gazette, however, disagreed, endorsing Ribble as a person who "would approach the major challenges facing our country with a set of fresh eyes" and criticizing Congressman Kagen because "there are no significant pieces of legislation or contributions that stand out to convince us he deserves a third term."

References

External links
Elections & Voting at the Wisconsin Government Accountability Board
Candidate list
U.S. Congress Candidates for Wisconsin at Project Vote Smart
Wisconsin U.S. House from OurCampaigns.com
Campaign contributions for U.S. Congressional races in Wisconsin from OpenSecrets
2010 Wisconsin General Election graph of multiple polls from Pollster.com

House - Wisconsin from the Cook Political Report

Election 2010 at the Milwaukee Journal Sentinel

House
2010
Wisconsin